Iru Mugan is a 2016 Indian Tamil-language science-fiction spy action thriller written and directed by Anand Shankar. Produced by Thameens Films, the film stars Vikram in a dual role. Nayanthara, Nithya Menen, Nassar, Thambi Ramaiah, Karunakaran and Riythvika feature in pivotal roles.

Principal photography commenced in December 2015. The major portion of the film was shot in Malaysia with few sequences in Chennai, Bangkok, Ladakh and Kashmir. Harris Jayaraj composed the film's soundtrack and score, while R. D. Rajasekhar and Bhuvan Srinivasan handled the cinematography and editing, respectively. The film was released on 8 September 2016 and received positive reviews. The film was a huge commercial success at the box office.

Plot 
An elderly Malaysian man goes berserk and kills several Indian officers in a span of five minutes at the Indian Embassy in Kuala Lumpur, Malaysia, before collapsing. A tattoo of a love symbol is present at the back of his neck, leading RAW agency to conclude that it is the handiwork of a rogue scientist named Love, whose identity and whereabouts are unknown to anyone except their agent Akhilan Vinod, who resigned from the agency. Four years ago, while on an assignment to bust Love, Akhilan's wife Meera George, a leading computer analyst, was killed by them. RAW chief Malik tracks down Akhilan and convinces him to join the investigation.

On viewing the video footage of the attack, Akhilan comes to the conclusion that the elderly Malaysian man had taken a mysterious performance-enhancing drug which allowed him to attack the Indian officials and decides to investigate the matter further in Malaysia. Since Akhilan is under suspension, Malik assigns him as a deputy to a junior RAW agent named Aayushi, who is officially assigned to handle the case, and the two of them leave for Kuala Lumpur. In Kuala Lumpur, Akhilan and Aayushi learn that the mysterious drug is inhaled using an asthma inhaler. Further investigations lead them to Peter, a scientist who is on Love's payroll.

Peter becomes an informer and tells them about the drug, which is called "Speed". The drug causes a person who inhales it to have extraordinary strength for five minutes before falling unconscious, and if the person inhales the drug again within a few hours, they will suffer a massive heart attack. Peter also reveals that a shipment of 'Speed' inhalers is to be dispatched to Love within the next 15 minutes. Akhilan and Aayushi pursue the lorry carrying the inhalers, but a lorry driver inhales Speed and subdues the duo, which are then taken to Love's hideout. As Akhilan moves to arrest Love, who turns out to be a transgender, he is knocked out by Meera, who is shockingly still alive and has been working for Love as a computer hacker and goes by the name Rosy.

It is then revealed that Meera suffers from retrograde amnesia after being shot in the head 4 years ago and that Love took advantage of her situation to employ her as a computer hacker, to create an impenetrable firewall. However, when Love orders her to kill Akhilan and Aayushi, she points the gun at Love and calls the police, who arrests him. Meera reveals that she had been forced to take 'Speed' by Love to work faster, but the drug caused her old memories, including those with Akhilan, to return, and she soon regained her full memory after continuous use of the drug. Love manages to obtain a 'Speed' inhaler while in custody and inhales it, helping her escape and destroy the entire police station, killing everyone present, including Aayushi. Aayushi had recorded the whole incident by using a Bluetooth camera.

Akhilan finds out that Love had made a satellite call to Chang, the Transport Minister of Malaysia, who had allowed Love to send shipments of 'Speed' inhalers to India to perpetrate terror attacks there in return for money. He rushes to the hospital, where Chang is admitted and interrogates him. During the interrogation, Love sneaks into the hospital and, hiding in the air conditioning vent, sprays a neurotoxic gas in Chang's room, causing Akhilan and Chang to get paralysed. She then kills Chang and puts the knife on Akhilan's hand, framing him as Chang's assassin. Akhilan and Meera are declared fugitives, but the duo manages to escape from the Malaysian police.

Akhilan and Meera decide to finish off Love using her kill switch activation device, which had been restored and hidden by Aayushi before she was killed. However, as the device can only be opened with Love's fingerprint, they plan on obtaining her fingerprint. They sneak into an illegal airfield owned by Chang, where Love is planning to leave for India with the shipments of Speed inhalers. Akhilan inhales Speed and fights Love, who has also inhaled Speed, and manages to get her fingerprint before collapsing after the drug's effect wears off. On regaining consciousness, he finds out that Love has already left for India.

It is shown that Akhilan used Silica gel to get Love's fingerprints. He then uses the fingerprints to open the kill switch activation device, deactivates Meera's kill switch and kills all of Love's henchmen, including those piloting the plane. The plane crashes into a remote jungle, killing Love, destroying the Speed shipments, and averting a major terrorist attack. A few weeks later, Akhilan and Meera are enjoying a holiday cruise on a private boat, sponsored by the Government of Malaysia, as a reward for killing Love. After discussing their future plans, Akhilan reveals that he had kept a Speed inhaler and inhales it.

Cast

Production

Development
Director Anand Shankar and Vikram were first announced to be collaborating in October 2014, with producer S. Thanu financing the venture. Anand Shankar completed the script throughout early 2015 and toured Malaysia to find locations, while Vikram completed his other projects.

Casting
Kajal Aggarwal and Priya Anand were signed on to portray the lead actresses, while Manush Nandan and Anirudh Ravichander were approached to be the film's cinematographer and compose the film's music, respectively. The project was titled as Marma Manithan and was reported to begin shooting in Malaysia from June 2015. Instead, production disputes took place during June 2015 after Ayngaran International also announced their interest in producing the film, with Thanu attempting to hand over the rights of the film. Priya Anand also opted out of the film, with Bindu Madhavi announced as her replacement. The ongoing changes subsequently stopped the team from beginning their shoot in Malaysia during July 2015, and the production was stalled. The delays meant that Vikram stopped waiting for the makers to begin work, changed his specially-prepared facial hair and went back to add finishing touches to his other ongoing project, 10 Endrathukulla (2015).

Ayngaran International backed out of the film in November 2015, prompting Anand Shankar to re-approach different producers to find new funding for the project. Later on in the month, Shibu Thameens agreed to produce the film and announced that the film would finally begin its first schedule in Malaysia during December 2015. The change of producer also meant significant changes were made to the cast and crew of the film, with Kajal Aggarwal dropped for Nayanthara. Bindu Madhavi was left out of the new team, while the makers discussed the secondary lead role with actresses Nithya Menen and Parvathy Thiruvothu, before Menen was selected. Likewise, R. D. Rajasekhar and Suresh Selvarajan were brought on board to handle the film's cinematography and art direction, respectively.

Crew
Harris Jayaraj was also subsequently confirmed as the film's music composer, and marked a return to signing films after taking a brief sabbatical actress Kalyani Priyadarshan worked as a production designer for the film.

Filming
The film was launched in December 2015, and it was revealed that the film would be shot in Chennai, Ladakh, Bangkok and Malaysia. The project was also retitled as Iru Mugan and a first look poster was released in early January 2016. In early 2016, the team shot two schedules in Malaysia and then in Chennai, before Anand Shankar headed to Kashmir to scout for further locations. A third schedule was completed in Chennai during March 2016.

Music

Harris Jayaraj composed the film's soundtrack and score, in which the film, marks his sixth collaboration with Vikram. The lyrics for the songs were written by Madhan Karky, Thamarai and Kavithai Gunder Emcee Jesz. The first song, "Halena", featuring Vikram and Nayanthara, was shot in various locations around Bangkok on April–May 2016. The second song, "Oh Maya", which also features the lead pair once again, were shot on mid-May 2016 in Kashmir, where a subsequent portion of the song was shot in Ladakh on June. The recording process for the songs were completed within July 2016. Sony Music acquired the audio rights of the film. The tracklist was released on 11 August 2016, which features five songs in the album, where one was a theme song. The full album was released on 14 August 2016 at a launch event held at Sathyam Cinemas, Chennai.

The album received mixed reviews. Behindwoods.com rated the soundtrack album 2.75 out of 5, stating that "Iru Mugan is a pleasant rendition of HJ's hip-hop style sounds that deserve a couple of slots in one's playlist". Indiaglitz rated the album 3 out of 5 and summarised that "Harris brings back the stylish quotient in IM by infusing youthful beats." Sify rated the album 4.25/5 reviewing that "This is vintage Harris delivering a mellifluous album!" Top10 Cinema reviewed it as a "Decent effort by Harris Jayaraj". Studioflicks rated it 3.25 out of 5, and reviewed it as "An assorted collection of Harris western melodies!" Moviecrow rated the album 3 out of 5, with a verdict "Harris Jayaraj brings his mojo back with the fresh highly stylized album devoid of deja-vu feel and the album surely stays in the top of the charts with couple of songs." The Times of India rated 2.5/5, stating "Except for two songs, Harris doesn't really make an impact with this album."

Release

Theatrical
Irumugan was initially slated to release on 2 September 2016, coinciding with Ganesh Chathurthi festival, but was pushed to 8 September 2016. This film, however did not release in Karnataka, due to the Bandh called by Karnataka Rakshana Vedhike, and also decided not to release any Tamil films on the state, because of the Kaveri river water dispute, which also affected several other Tamil films such as Thodari, Remo, Rekka and Devi as the films do not have a theatrical release in Karnataka.

Home media
In 2017, Zee Network bought the Tamil satellite rights and the Hindi dubbing rights of the film, and released the film in Hindi as International Rowdy.

Reception

Critical response
Upon its release Iru Mugan received mostly positive reviews from both critics and audiences.

M Suganth, from The Times of India rated 3.5 out of 5 stars, stating that "If Anand Shankar's previous film Arima Nambi had echoes of K. Bhagyaraj's Rudhra, the set-up of Iru Mugan recalls that of Kamal Haasan's Vikram." Behindwoods.com rated it 3.5 out of 5 stars, stating that "Vikram in full form, technically strong too. But script and logic could have been handled better."

Box office

Accolades
Filmfare Awards South award for Best actor - Vikram (Nominated)

References

External links 
 

2010s Tamil-language films
Films scored by Harris Jayaraj
2016 science fiction action films
Films set in Malaysia
Films shot in Malaysia
Indian science fiction action films
Films about the Research and Analysis Wing
Transgender-related films
Films about amnesia
Films about the Narcotics Control Bureau